Charles "Chuck" Aaron (call sign "Malibu") is an American pilot notable for being one of a handful of pilots licensed by the FAA to perform aerobatics in a helicopter in the United States, and one of only four such pilots in the entire world.  In 1980, Aaron worked on the air rescue program for NASA's Space Shuttle, and he founded his own company, FX Helicopters in Westlake Village, California in 1997. Aaron announced his retirement from the airshow circuit in 2015 and made his last performance for Red Bull at the November 2015 Red Bull Air Race World Championship in Las Vegas.

Aaron is also an experienced test pilot, having test-flown a TADS/PNVS Missile Guidance System for the Boeing AH-64 Apache; and an infrared vision system as the first helicopter pilot to deliberately fly into known brownout conditions to test the MAX VIZ IR camera. He is also an FAA certificated Airframe and Powerplant Mechanic, and has assembled many helicopters, including TAH-1F Cobras from surplus parts.

Aaron performed aerobatic maneuvers—loop, roll, vertical climb, Split S, Cuban Eight, Immelman, and "Chuckcevak" (modified Lomcovak)—at air shows and other demonstrations in an MBB Bo 105, with proprietary modifications invented by Aaron, that allow it to perform maneuvers previously impossible for helicopters. This was featured in the opening sequence of the James Bond film Spectre. He once served as Chief Pilot and Director of A&P Maintenance for the Red Bull N.A. One of Aaron's TAH-1F Cobras is flown on the European air show circuit, by "The Flying Bulls". It was heavily damaged/destroyed by the R.B. European pilot in an accident in May 2017. 

In 2019, Aaron opened a helicopter aerobatics flight school based at Concord Regional Airport.

Awards 
 1978 Received the "Sikorsky Rescue" Award for Saving a Life as a civilian flying a Sikorsky helicopter
 2006 Built First Ever FAA Certified Aerobatic Helicopter and Received the First Ever Air Worthiness Certificate from the FAA for a aerobatic helicopter.
 2009 Art Scholl Showmanship Award 
 2011 became a Member – Society of Experimental Test Pilots
 2013 became a Inductee – Living Legends of Aviation
 2014 Awarded the Pilot of the Year Award –   by the Helicopter Association International
 2016 Became a Board Member of HAI
 2016 Awarded "Lifetime Member" by the HAI
 2018 Started the First Ever FAA approved “Helicopter Aerobatic Training School” known

References

External links 
 Chuck Aaron - A Living Legend of Aviation - archive of official site (http://chuckaaron.com/), now defunct, which was always redirected to Red Bull site
 

American test pilots
Aviators from California
Helicopter pilots
Living people
Red Bull
1948 births